Ruben Gado (born 13 December 1993 in Saint-Denis, Réunion) is a French athlete competing in the combined events. He represented his country at the 2018 World Indoor Championships finishing seventh. He earlier won a silver medal at the 2017 Jeux de la Francophonie.

International competitions

Personal bests
Outdoor
100 metres – 10.75 (+0.3 m/s, Talence 2018)
200 metres – 22.30 (-1.0 m/s, Aurillac 2018)
400 metres – 47.65 (Berlin 2018)
1500 metres – 4:20.86 (Albi 2018)
110 metres hurdles – 14.88 (+1.2 m/s, Albi 2018)
High jump – 1.97 (Arona 2017)
Pole vault – 5.32 (Arona 2016)
Long jump – 7.43 (+1.5 m/s, Talence 2018)
Shot put – 13.63 (Albi 2018)
Discus throw – 39.87 (Albi 2018)
Javelin throw – 60.34 (Aubiére 2017)
Decathlon – 8126 (Albi 2018)

Indoor
60 metres – 6.97 (Aubiére 2016)
1000 metres – 2:36.65 (Reims 2016)
60 metres hurdles – 8.32 (Lyon 2015)
High jump – 2.00 (Madrid 2018)
Pole vault – 5.35 (Aubiére 2015)
Long jump – 7.33 (Madrid 2018)
Shot put – 13.61 (Birmingham 2018)
Heptathlon – 6014 (Madrid 2018)

References

1993 births
Living people
French decathletes
Sportspeople from Saint-Denis, Réunion
French people of Réunionnais descent